Veysey is a surname. Notable people with the surname include:

 John Veysey
 Ken Veysey (born 1967), English football player
 Sidney Veysey (born 1955), Canadian ice hockey player
 Victor Veysey (1915–2001), American politician